Naomi is the fourth studio album by American band The Cave Singers. It was released in March 2013 on Jagjaguwar.

Track listing

Personnel
 Pete Quirk – vocals, guitar, melodica, harmonica
 Derek Fudesco – guitar, bass pedals
 Marty Lund – drums, guitar
 Hanna Benn - backing vocals (track 2)
 Phil Ek - producer, engineer, mixing 
 Johnny Mendoza - assistant engineer for basic tracking
 Sean Lane - drum tech
 Clayton Merrell - cover

References

External links
 The Cave Singers at Jagjaguwar

2011 albums
Jagjaguwar albums
The Cave Singers albums